Junctional adhesion molecule A is a protein that in humans is encoded by the F11R gene. It has also been designated as CD321 (cluster of differentiation 321).

Function 

Tight junctions represent one mode of cell-to-cell adhesion in epithelial or endothelial cell sheets, forming continuous seals around cells and serving as a physical barrier to prevent solutes and water from passing freely through the paracellular space. The protein encoded by this immunoglobulin superfamily gene member is an important regulator of tight junction assembly in epithelia. In addition, the encoded protein can act as (1) a receptor for reovirus, (2) a ligand for the integrin LFA1, involved in leukocyte transmigration, and (3) a platelet receptor. Multiple transcript variants encoding two different isoforms have been found for this gene.

Interactions 

F11 receptor has been shown to interact with MLLT4, CASK and Tight junction protein 1.

References

Further reading

External links 
 

Clusters of differentiation